Heterotoma may refer to:

 Heterotoma (bug), a genus of bug from the family Miridae
 Heterotoma (plant), a genus of Mexican spurred lobelias, whose members are sometimes classified in Lobelia